Savelii Ivanovych Makhno (1872 – 21 February 1920) was a Ukrainian anarcho-communist, member of the Makhnovist movement, and brother of Nestor Makhno.

Biography
Savelii Makhno was born in 1872 in Huliaipole to a poor peasant family. Shortly after the birth of his younger brother Nestor, Savelii's father died, leaving he and his brothers in the care of his mother. By the turn of the 20th century, Savelii was married to Theodora and had 7 children - Thomas, Paul, Ivan, Gregory, Anastasia, Evdokia and Maria.

In 1904, Savelii was called up to serve in the Imperial Russian Army and set off to fight in the Russo-Japanese War. After returning home during the 1905 Revolution, he joined the anarcho-communist Union of Poor Peasants in 1907. Savelii's brother Nestor was arrested and imprisoned for his own activities in the Union, only being released following the February Revolution. Upon Nestor's return to Huliaipole, he was greeted by Savelii, along with his mother and his elder brother Omelian, and they set about reorganising the town's anarchist movement. Over the subsequent months, Savelii participated in the foundation of a libertarian society in Huliaipole.

Following the October Revolution, a civil war broke out in Ukraine, as the forces of the Central Council of Ukraine and the Ukrainian People's Republic of Soviets struggled to take power. The Huliaipole Soviet resolved to intervene against the Ukrainian nationalists, which were threatening the nearby city of Oleksandrivsk. On 4 January 1918, a 800-strong detachment of Black Guards was established in Huliaipole, with Savelii elected as its commander, and they set by train off towards Oleksandrivsk, where they linked up with the Red Guards under the command of Semyon Bogdanov. 

After a few days of fighting, the city was captured from the nationalists by the combined Soviet forces. A revolutionary committee was subsequently established as the city's centre of power, with Nestor Makhno and Maria Nikiforova being elected to prominent positions. Savelii's Black Guards occupied the Kichkassky bridge across the Dnieper and began to disarm the Cossacks who were leaving the front. But following the ratification of the Treaty of Brest-Litovsk and the subsequent advance of the Central Powers through Ukraine, Savelii left Oleksandrivsk with his detachment and returned to Huliaipole for reorganization.

This is how the Izvestiya newspaper described the situation of Savelii's family during the period of the Austro-German occupation:

After the arrival of the Germans, Savelii disappeared in an unknown direction. In April 1918, Savelii participated in an anarchist conference in Taganrog, where it was decided that insurgents would return to Ukraine by July 1918 and carry out an insurrection against the occupying powers. Savelii resolved to return immediately and crossed back over the front lines into southern Ukraine, but he was captured and imprisoned in Oleksandrivsk. Nestor learnt of his brother's arrest upon his own return to Ukraine in July. 

By November 1918, Nestor's Revolutionary Insurgent Army had driven the Austrian forces out of Huliaipole and established a free soviet to coordinate the local workers, peasants and insurgents. They immediately set about attempting to secure the release of anarchist prisoners, including Savelii, but the Ukrainian State stalled on the negotiations. But following the Armistice of 11 November 1918 and the subsequent overthrow of Pavlo Skoropadskyi by the Directorate, the new Ukrainian authorities declared an amnesty for all political prisoners and Savelii was finally released on 14 December.

Upon his return, Savelii joined the Makhnovshchina as an officer in the supply services. He was later elected by a Regional Congress to head the supply department, which oversaw the confiscation of property from the local bourgeoisie. Following the capture of Huliaipole by the Armed Forces of South Russia in June 1919, Savelii's wife was tortured and then executed by officers of the White movement. Makhno subsequently ordered Vasyl Kurylenko to personally track down and exact revenge against his wife's killers, which he carried out swiftly.

Following the conquest of eastern Ukraine by the Red Army in January 1920, the 13th Red Army carried out a surprise attack against the Makhnovists in Huliaipole, liquidating the local forces in an operation directed against the Insurgent Army's general staff.

References

Bibliography

 
 

1872 births
1920 deaths
20th-century executions by Russia
Anarchist partisans
Executed anarchists
Makhnovshchina
People from Huliaipole
People of the Russian Revolution
People of the Russian Civil War
Russian military personnel of the Russo-Japanese War
Soviet people of the Ukrainian–Soviet War
Ukrainian anarchists
Ukrainian communists
Ukrainian guerrillas
Ukrainian people executed by the Soviet Union
Ukrainian rebels
Ukrainian revolutionaries